Broken bridge may refer to:

 Bridge to nowhere, a bridge with at least one broken side
 Broken bridge, Chennai, India
 Yalu River Broken Bridge, Dandong, China
 The Broken Bridge, a 1990 young-adult novel by Philip Pullman
 Broken Bridges, a 2006 American film by Steven Goldmann

See also
 Duanqiao (disambiguation) for Chinese topics